Parliamentary elections were held in Estonia between 21 and 23 May 1932.

Background
Before the elections major shifts occurred in the political landscape. The Farmers' Assemblies (mostly backed by the "old farmers" and those somewhat more conservative and economically right-wing) and Settlers' Party (patriotic left-of-centre agrarian) merged to form the Union of Settlers and Smallholders, whilst the Estonian People's Party, the Christian People's Party, the Labour Party and the Landlords' Party merged to form the National Centre Party.

Results

See also
V Riigikogu

References

V Riigikogu valimised : 21.-23.maini 1932; Riigi Statistika Keskbüroo = Élections au parlement : de 21.-23. mai 1932; Bureau Central de Statistique de l'Estonie  - Tallinn : Riigi Statistika Keskbüroo, 1932

Parliamentary elections in Estonia
Estonia
1932 in Estonia